This is an incomplete list of historic properties and districts at United States colleges and universities that are listed on the National Register of Historic Places (NRHP).  This includes National Historic Landmarks (NHLs) and other National Register of Historic Places listings.  It includes listings at current and former educational institutions.

The main list is organized by institution name. A second list of NHLs at colleges and universities is organized by state.

Of the colleges and universities listed here, the University of California, Berkeley, has the most NRHP listings, with 22, including one NHL. Tied for second are Harvard University with 17 NRHP listing including two historic districts and five NHLs, and the University of Florida which has 17, including one historic district with 14 contributing properties. The University of Wisconsin–Madison has the third most identified sites, with 16, of which four are NHLs.

NRHPs by college or university

Abilene Christian University
In Abilene, Texas
Abilene Christian College Administration Building
 Luce Hall

Alabama A&M University

Alabama State University

University of Alabama
In Tuscaloosa, Alabama
Foster Auditorium (NHL)

Alcorn State University
In Lorman, Mississippi, this university has 2 (1 NHL):

Alderson Broaddus University
In Philippi, West Virginia

|}

Allen University

Institute of American Indian Arts
In Santa Fe, New Mexico
Federal Building

Anderson University
In Anderson, South Carolina
Anderson College Historic District

Andover Newton Theological School
In Newton, Massachusetts has:
 Colby Hall (Newton, Massachusetts)

Arcadia University
In Glenside, Pennsylvania
Grey Towers Castle (NHL)

University of Arizona
In Tucson, Arizona
Men's Gymnasium
Old Library Building
Old Main

Arkansas Baptist College
In Little Rock, Arkansas
Main Building, Arkansas Baptist College

University of Arkansas
In Fayetteville, Arkansas
Agriculture Building – University of Arkansas, Fayetteville
Business Administration Building – University of Arkansas, Fayetteville
Chemistry Building – University of Arkansas, Fayetteville
Chi Omega Greek Theatre – University of Arkansas, Fayetteville
Home Economics Building – University of Arkansas, Fayetteville
Men's Gymnasium – University of Arkansas, Fayetteville
Old Main, University of Arkansas
Student Union Building – University of Arkansas, Fayetteville
University of Arkansas Campus Historic District
Vol Walker Library – University of Arkansas, Fayetteville

University of the Arts
In Philadelphia, Pennsylvania
Philadelphia College of Art

Asbury University
In Wilmore, Kentucky
Asbury College Administration Building
Morrison–Kenyon Library

Athens State University
In Athens, Alabama
Athens State College Historic District

Auburn University

Augsburg University
In Minneapolis, Minnesota
Old Main (Augsburg University)

Augusta State University
In Augusta, Georgia
Stephen Vincent Benet House

Augustana College

Aurora University
In Aurora, Illinois
Aurora College Complex (Eckhart, Davis & Wilkinson Halls)

Baldwin Wallace University
In Berea, Ohio
Baldwin-Wallace College South Campus Historic District

Ball State University
In Muncie, Indiana
Bracken House

Barber–Scotia College
In Concord, North Carolina
Barber–Scotia College

Bates College
In Lewiston, Maine
Hathorn Hall

Beth College
In North Newton, Kansas
Bethel College Administration Building

Belmont Abbey College
In Belmont, North Carolina
Belmont Abbey Cathedral
Belmont Abbey Historic District

Benedict College
In Columbia, South Carolina
Benedict College Historic District

Bennett College
In Greensboro, North Carolina
Bennett College Historic District

Berea College
In Berea, Kentucky
Lincoln Hall, Berea College (NHL)

Bethany College (Bethany, West Virginia)
In Bethany, West Virginia

|}

Bethune–Cookman University
In Daytona Beach, Florida
Bethune–Cookman College Historic District
Mary McLeod Bethune Home (NHL)

Birmingham–Southern College
In Birmingham, Alabama
Birmingham–Southern College

Blue Mountain College
In Blue Mountain, Mississippi
Blue Mountain College Historic District

Bluefield State College
In Bluefield, West Virginia

|}

Brandeis University
In Waltham, Massachusetts
Brandeis University President's House (Newtonville)
The Castle

Brown University
In Providence, Rhode Island
University Hall (Brown University) (NHL)
Nightingale–Brown House (NHL)
Gardner House
Corliss–Brackett House
Ladd Observatory

Boston College
In Chestnut Hill, Newton, Massachusetts
 Boston College Main Campus Historic District

Bowdoin College
In Brunswick, Maine
Massachusetts Hall, Bowdoin College

Bryn Mawr College
In Bryn Mawr, Pennsylvania
Bryn Mawr College Historic District
M. Carey Thomas Library (NHL)

Butler University
In Indianapolis, Indiana:
Hinkle Fieldhouse (NHL)

California University of Pennsylvania
In California, Pennsylvania
Old Main, California State College

University of California, Berkeley
In Berkeley, CA, has

University of California, San Diego
In La Jolla, California has
Audrey Geisel University House
Old Scripps Building

California State University, Long Beach
In Long Beach, California
Puvunga Indian Village Sites

Carleton College
In Northfield, Minnesota has 4:
Goodsell Observatory
Scoville Memorial Library (Carleton College)
Skinner Memorial Chapel
Willis Hall (Carleton College)

Case Western Reserve University
In Cleveland, Ohio
Adelbert Hall, Case Western Reserve University
Allen Memorial Medical Library

College of St. Catherine
In Saint Paul, Minnesota
Derham Hall and Our Lady of Victory Chapel

Centenary College of Louisiana
In Jackson, Louisiana
Centenary College

Centenary University
In Hackettstown, New Jersey

|}

University of Central Arkansas
In Conway, Arkansas
Administration Building, University of Central Arkansas

Centre College
In Danville, Kentucky:
Old Centre

University of Chicago
In Chicago, Illinois
 George Herbert Jones Laboratory (NHL)

University of Cincinnati
In Cincinnati, Ohio
 Cincinnati Observatory (NHL)

Claflin University
In Orangeburg, South Carolina
Claflin College Historic District

Clark University
In Worcester, Massachusetts
Clark University

Clemson University

College of Charleston

Colgate University
In Hamilton, New York
Old Biology Hall

Columbia University
In New York, NY has at least 11 (3 NHLs):

Brooks and Hewitt Halls
Casa Italiana
Delta Psi, Alpha Chapter
Earl Hall
Hotel Theresa
Low Memorial Library (NHL)
Milbank, Brinckerhoff, and Fiske Halls
Philosophy Hall (NHL)
Pupin Hall (NHL)
Sheffield Farms Stable 
Students' Hall
Union Theological Seminary
Additionally, the 116th Street–Columbia University station is listed on the NRHP as part of the New York Subway System Multiple Property Submission.

Concordia College
In Moorhead, Minnesota has 1:
Main Building, Concordia College

University of Connecticut
In Mansfield, Connecticut
University of Connecticut Historic District – Connecticut Agricultural School

Cooper Union
In New York, New York (NHL)

Cornell University
In Ithaca, New York, has 10 (1 NHL):
 Andrew Dickson White House
 Bailey Hall
 Caldwell Hall
 Comstock Hall
 Delta Kappa Epsilon / "Deke" House
 Fernow Hall
 Llenroc
 Morrill Hall (NHL)
 Rice Hall
 Wing Hall
In addition, East Robert Hall, Roberts Hall, and Stone Hall are former buildings that are still listed on the National Register despite having been demolished.  See Cornell University#Historic Sites for how these are described in the article about the university.

Davidson College
In Davidson, North Carolina
Eumenean Hall, Davidson College
Philanthropic Hall, Davidson College

Davis & Elkins College
In Elkins, West Virginia

|}

Dakota Wesleyan University
In Mitchell, South Dakota, the entire university, apparently, is NRHP-listed.

Dickinson College
In Carlisle, Pennsylvania:
Old West, Dickinson College (NHL)

Doane College
In Crete, Nebraska
Doane College Historic Buildings

Drake University

Drexel University
In Philadelphia, Pennsylvania
Woman's Medical College of Pennsylvania

Drury University
In Springfield, Missouri
Stone Chapel

University of Dubuque
In Dubuque, Iowa
Old Chapel Hall

Earlham College
In Richmond, Indiana:
 Earlham College Observatory

Eastern Illinois University
In Charleston, Illinois
Pemberton Hall and Gymnasium

Eastern Michigan University
In Ypsilanti, Michigan
Eastern Michigan University Historic District
Pease Auditorium

Eastern Oregon University
In La Grande, Oregon:
 Administration Building

Edinboro University of Pennsylvania

Edward Waters College

Elmira College
In Elmira, New York
Elmira College Old Campus

Emory University
In Atlanta, Georgia
Emory Grove Historic District
Emory University Historic District
Oxford Historic District
University Park–Emory Highlands–Emory Estates Historic District

Emory and Henry College
In Emory, Virginia
Emory and Henry College

Erskine College

Eleutherian College
In Jefferson County, Indiana
Eleutherian College Classroom and Chapel Building (NHL)

Eureka College
In Eureka, Illinois
Eureka College Administration and Chapel

University of Evansville
In Evansville, Indiana
Evansville College

Fairmont State University
In Fairmont, West Virginia

|}

Finlandia University
In Hancock, Michigan
Old Main, Suomi College

Fisk University
In Nashville, Tennessee
Fisk University Historic District
Jubilee Hall (NHL)

Florida A&M University
In Tallahassee, Florida
Carnegie Library

Florida Institute of Technology (Jensen Beach Campus)

in Jensen Beach, Florida
The former campus, which was previously the campus of Saint Joseph College of Florida, contains two NRHPs, one sitting on top of the other:
 Tuckahoe (Florida), once the administration building of both colleges, is a 1938 mansion built on top of:
 Mount Elizabeth Archeological Site, a prehistoric midden.

University of Florida

Florida Southern College
In Lakeland, Florida
Florida Southern College Architectural District

Framingham State College
In Framingham, Massachusetts
The former St. John's Episcopal Church (Framingham, Massachusetts) is now the Ecumenical Center at Framingham State College.

Franklin College
In Franklin, Indiana
Franklin College Library (Shirk Hall)
Franklin College–Old Main

Franklin & Marshall College 
In Lancaster, Pennsylvania
 Diagnothian Hall
 Goethean Hall
 Old Main

Gallaudet University
In Washington, D.C. has 3:
 Chapel Hall, Gallaudet College
 Gallaudet College Historic District
 President's House, Gallaudet College

George Fox University
In Newberg, Oregon
 Jesse Edwards House
 Minthorn Hall

Georgetown College
In Georgetown, Kentucky
Georgetown College Historic Buildings
 Giddings Hall, Georgetown College

Georgetown University
In Washington, D.C. has 2 (1 NHL):
 Georgetown University Astronomical Observatory
 Healy Building, Georgetown University (NHL)

Georgia College & State University
In Milledgeville, Georgia
Atkinson Hall, Georgia College

Georgia Institute of Technology
In Atlanta, Georgia
Georgia Institute of Technology Historic District
Omega Chapter of the Chi Phi Fraternity

University of Georgia
In Athens, Georgia
Jackson Street Cemetery
Lucy Cobb Institute
Old North Campus, University of Georgia
In addition, Garden Club of Georgia Museum–Headquarters House, Founder's Memorial Garden and Gov. Wilson Lumpkin House are on the campus and may be part of the University of Georgia.

Georgia State University
In Atlanta, Georgia
Dixie Coca-Cola Bottling Company Plant

Georgian Court University
In Lakewood, New Jersey
 Georgian Court (NHL)

Gettysburg College
In Gettysburg, Pennsylvania
Pennsylvania Hall, Gettysburg College

Goucher College 
In Towson, Maryland

 Goucher College
 Old Goucher College Buildings (Baltimore, Maryland)

Grand View University

Greenville College
In Greenville, Illinois
Old Main, Almira College

Grinnell College

Guilford College
In Greensboro, North Carolina
Guilford College

Gustavus Adolphus College
In St. Peter, Minnesota has 1:
Old Main, Gustavus Adolphus College

Hamilton College
In Clinton, New York
Hamilton College Chapel
Elihu Root House (NHL)

Hampton University
In Hampton, Virginia (NHL)

Hampden–Sydney College
In Hampden Sydney, Virginia
Hampden–Sydney College Historic District
Cushing Hall
Venable Hall

Hanover College
In Hanover, Indiana
Thomas A. Hendricks Library

Hardin–Simmons University
In Abilene, Texas
Caldwell Hall

Harris–Stowe State University
In St. Louis, Missouri
Harris Teachers College

Hartwick College
In Oneonta, New York
Bresee Hall

Harvard University
In Cambridge, Massachusetts
Austin Hall (Harvard University)
Bertram Hall at Radcliffe College
Carpenter Center for the Visual Arts
Eliot Hall at Radcliffe College
Fogg Art Museum
Harvard Houses Historic District
Harvard Stadium in Boston, Massachusetts
Harvard Union
Hasty Pudding Club
Massachusetts Hall, Harvard University (NHL)
Memorial Hall (Harvard University) (NHL)
Old Harvard Yard (NHL)
Porcellian Club
Sears Tower – Harvard Observatory
Sever Hall (NHL)
University Hall (Harvard University) (NHL)
University Museum

Haskell Indian Nations University
In Lawrence, Kansas
Haskell Institute (NHL)

Heidelberg University
In Tiffin, Ohio
Founders Hall, Heidelberg College

Hendrix College
In Conway, Arkansas
Galloway Hall
Martin Hall
President's House
Young Memorial

College of Holy Cross
In Worcester, Massachusetts
College of Holy Cross

Huntingdon College
In Montgomery, Alabama
Huntingdon College Campus Historic District

Huston–Tillotson University
In Austin, Texas
Administration Hall

Illinois Institute of Technology
In Chicago, Illinois
Illinois Institute of Technology Academic Campus
S.R. Crown Hall (NHL)

Illinois College
In Jacksonville, Illinois
Beecher Hall, Illinois College

Illinois State University
In Normal, Illinois
John W. Cook Hall

University of Illinois at Chicago
Chicago, Illinois
Hull House (NHL)

University of Illinois at Urbana–Champaign
In Urbana and Champaign, Illinois
Altgeld Hall
Chemical Laboratory
Library–University of Illinois at Urbana–Champaign
Metal Shop
Military Drill Hall and Men's Gymnasium
Morrow Plots, University of Illinois (NHL)
Mumford House
Natural History Building
Tina Weedon Smith Memorial Hall
University of Illinois Astronomical Observatory (NHL)
University of Illinois Experimental Dairy Farm Historic District
Women's Gymnasium, University of Illinois at Urbana–Champaign
Women's Residence Hall–West Residence Hall, University of Illinois at Urbana–Champaign

University of the Incarnate Word
In San Antonio, Texas
University of Incarnate Word Administration Building

Indiana State University
In Terre Haute, Indiana
Federal Hall

Indiana University (Bloomington)
In Bloomington, Indiana
Legg House
Millen House
The Old Crescent
Andrew Wylie House

Iowa State University
In Ames, Iowa
The Farm House (Knapp–Wilson House) (NHL)
Agriculture Hall
Alumni Hall
Christian Petersen Courtyard Sculptures, and Dairy Industry Building
Engineering Hall
Marston Water Tower

University of Iowa
In Iowa City, IA has 1 NHL and 1 other NRHP:
Old Capitol (NHL)
Pentacrest

Iowa Wesleyan College

Johns Hopkins University
In Baltimore, Maryland
Homewood Museum
Evergreen Museum & Library

Johnson C. Smith University
In Charlotte, North Carolina
Biddle Memorial Hall, Johnson C. Smith University

Judson College
In Marion, Alabama
Judson College Historic District

Kansas State University
In Manhattan, Kansas
Anderson Hall

Kean University
In Union, New Jersey

|}

Kenyon College
In Gambier, Ohio
Kenyon College

Knox College (Illinois)
In Galesburg, Illinois:
Old Main, Knox College (NHL)

Lafayette College
In Easton, Pennsylvania

|}

LaGrange College
In LaGrange, Georgia
College Home/Smith Hall

Lake Erie College
In Painesville, Ohio
Administration Building, Lake Erie College

Lander University
In Greenwood, South Carolina
Lander College Old Main Building

Lane College
In Jackson, Tennessee:
 Lane College Historic District and Boundary Increase

Lawrence University
In Appleton, Wisconsin:
Main Hall

Lehigh University
In Bethlehem, Pennsylvania

|}

Lewis & Clark College
In Portland, Oregon:
M. Lloyd Frank Estate

Limestone College
In Gaffney, South Carolina
Winnie Davis Hall

Lincoln Memorial University
In Knoxville, Tennessee
Old Knoxville City Hall

Lincoln University of Missouri
In Jefferson City, Missouri
Lincoln Univ. Hilltop Campus Historic District

Linfield College
In McMinnville, Oregon
 Pioneer Hall (Oregon)

Longwood University

Louisiana State University
In Baton Rouge, Louisiana
The French House
Louisiana State University, Baton Rouge
LSU Campus Mounds

University of Louisville
In Louisville, Kentucky
University of Louisville Belknap Campus

Luther College

Lutheran Theological Seminary at Gettysburg
In Gettysburg, Pennsylvania
Lutheran Theological Seminary–Old Dorm

University of Maine at Orono
In Orono, Maine
University of Maine at Orono Historic District

Manhattanville College
In Purchase, New York
Reid Hall, Manhattanville College

Mars Hill College
In Mars Hill, North Carolina
Mars Hill College Historic District

Martin Luther College
In New Ulm, Minnesota
Old Main, Dr. Martin Luther College

Mary Baldwin College
In Staunton, Virginia
Hilltop
Kable House
Mary Baldwin College, Main Building

Macalester College
In Saint Paul, Minnesota
Old Main, Macalester College

Manchester University
In North Manchester, Indiana
Manchester University Historic District

Marycrest College
In Davenport, Iowa
 Marycrest College Historic District

University of Maryland, Baltimore
College of Medicine of Maryland (NHL)

University of Massachusetts Lowell
In Lowell, Massachusetts
 Allen House

McDaniel College
In Westminster, Maryland
Western Maryland College Historic District

McMurry College
In Abilene, Texas
McMurry College Administration Building

Mercer University
In Macon, Georgia
Mercer University Administration Building

Miami University
In Oxford, Ohio
Elliott and Stoddard Halls
Herron Gymnasium (demolished)
 Langstroth Cottage (NHL)
Oxford Female Institute
Oxford Female College (demolished)
Sigma Alpha Epsilon Chapter House of Miami University
 William H. McGuffey House (NHL)
Zachariah Price Dewitt Cabin

University of Michigan
In Ann Arbor, Michigan
Newberry Hall
President's House, University of Michigan
University of Michigan Central Campus Historic District

Michigan State University
In East Lansing, Michigan
Eustace Hall

Michigan Technological University
In Houghton, Michigan
College Club House and Gymnasium

Middlebury College
In Middlebury, Vermont
 Emma Willard House

Miles College
In Fairfield, Alabama
Miles Memorial College Historic District

Minnesota State University, Mankato
In Mankato, Minnesota
Old Main, Mankato State Teachers College

University of Minnesota
Soudan Underground Mine State Park (remote laboratory)

In Minneapolis, Minnesota
University of Minnesota Old Campus Historic District

University of Minnesota Duluth
Duluth State Normal School Historic District, now known as the "Lower Campus"

University of Minnesota Morris
In Morris, Minnesota
Morris Industrial School for Indians Dormitory
West Central School of Agriculture and Experiment Station Historic District

Dakota College at Bottineau
In Bottineau, North Dakota
Old Main (Dakota College at Bottineau)

University of Mississippi
In Oxford, Mississippi
Lyceum-The Circle Historic District

Mississippi State University
In Starkville, Mississippi
Montgomery Hall
Textile Building

Missouri Western State University
In St. Joseph, Missouri
Robidoux School

University of Missouri
In Columbia, Missouri
Francis Quadrangle Historic District
Sanborn Field and Soil Erosion Plots (NHL)

Monmouth College
In Monmouth, Illinois
Ivory Quinby House

Monmouth University
In West Long Branch, New Jersey

|}

University of Montevallo
In Montevallo, Alabama
Alabama Girls' Industrial School

Moore College of Art and Design
In Philadelphia, Pennsylvania
Philadelphia School of Design for Women

Morehead State University
In Morehead, Kentucky
Morehead State University

Morgan State University
In Baltimore, Maryland
Morgan State University Memorial Chapel

Morningside College

Mundelein College
In Chicago, Illinois
Mundelein College Skyscraper Building

Murray State University
In Murray, Kentucky
Murray State University Historic Buildings

Nebraska Wesleyan University
In Lincoln, Nebraska
Phi Kappa Tau Fraternity House
Old Main, Nebraska Wesleyan University

University of New England
In Portland, Maine
Westbrook College Historic District

New Jersey Institute of Technology
In Newark, New Jersey
Newark Orphan Asylum

New York University
In New York, New York
General Winfield Scott House

University of North Alabama
In Florence, Alabama
Wesleyan Hall

North Carolina Agricultural and Technical State University
In Greensboro, North Carolina
Agricultural and Technical College of North Carolina Historic District

North Carolina Central University
In Durham, North Carolina
North Carolina Central University

University of North Carolina at Chapel Hill
Old East
Old Chapel Hill Cemetery
Playmakers Theatre

University of North Carolina at Pembroke
In Pembroke, North Carolina
Old Main, Pembroke State University

North Dakota State University
In Fargo, North Dakota
North Dakota State University District

Northeastern University
In Boston, Massachusetts
Students House

Northern Michigan University
In Marquette, Michigan
Longyear Hall of Pedagogy – Northern Michigan University

Northwestern College
In Orange City, Iowa
Zwemer Hall

Notre Dame College
In South Euclid, Ohio
Its 1927 Administration Building, which once housed the entire college operation, was added to the NRHP as Notre Dame College of Ohio

University of Notre Dame
In South Bend, Indiana
University of Notre Dame: Main and South Quadrangles

Notre Dame de Namur University
In Belmont, California
Ralston Hall (NHL)

Oberlin College
In Oberlin, Ohio
the whole thing (NHL)

Ohio University
In Athens, Ohio
Manasseh Cutler Hall, Ohio University (NHL)

Ohio Wesleyan University
In Delaware, Ohio
Austin Hall
Edwards Gymnasium/Pfieffer Natatorium
Monnett Hall, former listing
Ohio Wesleyan University Student Observatory
Sanborn Hall
Selby Field
Stuyvesant Hall
University Hall – Gray's Chapel

University of Oklahoma
In Norman, Oklahoma
Beta Theta Pi Fraternity House
Bizzell Memorial Library (NHL)
Boyd House
Casa Blanca

Oregon State University
In Corvallis, Oregon
Oregon State University Historic District

University of Oregon
In Eugene, Oregon
Dads' Gates
Deady and Villard Halls, University of Oregon (NHL)
Deady Hall
Johnson Hall
University of Oregon Library and Memorial Quadrangle
University of Oregon Museum of Art
Villard Hall
Women's Memorial Quadrangle Ensemble

University of the Ozarks
In Clarksville, Arkansas
Raymond Munger Memorial Chapel – University of the Ozarks

Pacific University
In Forest Grove, Oregon
Old College Hall

Palmer College of Chiropractic

Park Region Luther College
In Fergus Falls, Minnesota
the whole thing (84000241)

Peace College
In Raleigh, North Carolina
Peace College Main Building

University of Pennsylvania
In Philadelphia, Pennsylvania
College Hall (University of Pennsylvania)
Fisher Fine Arts Library (NHL)
Pennsylvania Hospital (NHL)
St. Anthony Hall House
University of Pennsylvania Campus Historic District

The Pennsylvania State University
In State College, Pennsylvania
Ag Hill Historic District
Farmer's High School Historic District

University of Pittsburgh
In Pittsburgh, Pennsylvania has 4 NRHPs:
Allegheny Observatory
Cathedral of Learning
Ford Motor Building
The Schenley Farms National Historic District includes 17 university owned contributing properties:
Allen Hall
Alumni Hall
Bellefield Hall
Clapp Hall
Frick Fine Arts Building
Gardner Steel Conference Center
Heinz Memorial Chapel
Music Building
O'Hara Student Center
Ruskin Hall
Schenley Quadrangle (consisting of 5 individual residence halls)
Stephen Foster Memorial
Thackeray Hall
Thaw Hall
Twentieth Century Club
University Club
William Pitt Union

University of Portland
In Portland, Oregon:
West Hall

University of Puerto Rico, Río Piedras Campus 
In San Juan, Puerto Rico

 Residencia de Señoritas Building
 Roosevelt Tower (La Torre) and The Quadrangle

University of Puerto Rico at Mayagüez 
In Mayagüez, Puerto Rico

 Casa Solariega de Jose De Diego
 José de Diego Building

Pratt Institute
In Brooklyn, New York
Pratt Institute Historic District

Princeton University
In Princeton, New Jersey
Nassau Hall (NHL)
Joseph Henry House (NHL)
President's House (Princeton) (NHL)
Princeton Battlefield (NHL)
Prospect (Princeton) (NHL)

Principia College
In Elsah, Illinois
 Principia College Historic District  (NHL)  had 13 Bernard Maybeck buildings, 11 of which are still standing and in use

Randolph College
In Lynchburg, Virginia
Randolph-Macon College Buildings

Randolph–Macon Woman's College
In Lynchburg, Virginia
Main Hall, Randolph-Macon Women's College

Red River Valley University
In Wahpeton, North Dakota

Rensselaer Polytechnic Institute
In Troy, New York
Old Troy Hospital (aka West Hall)
W. & L. E. Gurley Building (NHL)
Winslow Chemical Laboratory

Roanoke College
In Salem, Virginia
Main Campus Complex, Roanoke College

Rollins College

Rockefeller University
In New York, NY has 1 NHL:
Founder's Hall, The Rockefeller University (NHL)

Roosevelt University
In Chicago, Illinois
Auditorium Building (NHL)

Rutgers University
In New Brunswick, New Jersey

|}

University of the Sacred Heart 
In San Juan, Puerto Rico

 Administration Building and chapel

Salem International University
In Salem, West Virginia

|}

San Diego State University
In San Diego, California
Aztec Bowl
San Diego State College

Santa Fe College
In Gainesville, Florida
Old Bradford County Courthouse

Sheldon Jackson College
In Sitka, Alaska(NHL)

Shippensburg University of Pennsylvania
In Shippensburg, Pennsylvania
Cumberland Valley State Normal School Historic District

Saint Ambrose University

St. Augustine's University
In Raleigh, North Carolina
St. Augustine's College Campus

St. Benedict's College
In St. Joseph, Minnesota
St. Benedict's Convent and College Historic District

Saint Joseph College of Florida
In Jensen Beach, Florida
See Florida Institute of Technology (Jensen Beach Campus) above

St. Lawrence University
In Canton, New York
Herring–Cole Hall, St. Lawrence University
Richardson Hall, St. Lawrence University
St. Lawrence University – Old Campus Historic District

St. Olaf College
In Northfield, Minnesota
Old Main, St. Olaf College
Steensland Library

St. Edward's University
In Austin, Texas
St. Edward's University Main Building and Holy Cross Dormitory

Saint Paul's College
In Lawrenceville, Virginia
Saint Paul's College

Sam Houston State University
In Huntsville, Texas
Sam Houston House

Scripps College
In Claremont, California
Scripps College for Women

Seton Hall University
In South Orange, New Jersey
Eugene V. Kelly Carriage House

Shaw University
In Raleigh, North Carolina
Estey Hall

Simmons College of Kentucky
In Louisville, Kentucky
Municipal College Campus, Simmons University

Simpson College
In Indianola, Iowa
Science Hall

Smith College
In Northampton, Massachusetts
Smith Alumnae Gymnasium

Snow College
In Ephraim, Utah
Snow Academy Building

South College
In Knoxville, Tennessee
Knoxville Business College

University of South Carolina
In Columbia, South Carolina
 Old Campus District

South Georgia College
In McRae, Georgia
South Georgia College Administration Building

Southeastern Louisiana University
In Hammond, Louisiana
McGehee Hall, Southeastern Louisiana State University

Southern Methodist University
In Dallas, Texas
Dallas Hall

Southern Utah University
In Cedar City, Utah
Old Main and Science Buildings

Southwestern University
In Georgetown, Texas
Southwestern University Administration Building and Mood Hall

University of Southern Maine
In Gorham, Maine
McLellan House

University of Southern Mississippi
In Hattiesburg, Mississippi
The University of Southern Mississippi Historic District

Spring Hill College

Stanford University
In Palo Alto, California
Hanna–Honeycomb House

Stephens College
In Columbia, Missouri
Senior Hall
Stephens College South Campus Historic District

Stetson University
In DeLand, Florida
DeLand Hall
Stetson University Campus Historic District

Stevens Institute of Technology
In Hoboken, New Jersey
Morton Memorial Laboratory of Chemistry
Edwin A. Stevens Hall
William Hall Walker Gymnasium

Storer College
In Harpers Ferry, West Virginia

The entire campus of the now closed college is a contributing property to the Harpers Ferry National Historical Park.

Susquehanna University
In Pennsylvania
Selinsgrove Hall and Seibert Hall

Swarthmore College
In Pennsylvania
Benjamin West Birthplace (NHL)

Syracuse University
In Syracuse, NY has 15:
Crouse College, Syracuse University
Hall of Languages, Syracuse University
Pi Chapter House of Psi Upsilon Fraternity
Syracuse University-Comstock Tract Buildings

Talladega College

University of Tampa

University of Tennessee
University of Tennessee Agriculture Farm Mound (address restricted, Knox County)

University of Tennessee at Chattanooga
In Chattanooga, Tennessee
Clarence T. Jones Observatory

Tennessee Technological University
In Cookeville, Tennessee
Henderson Hall

Texas Tech University
In Lubbock, Texas
Texas Technological College Dairy Barn
Texas Technological College Historic District

University of Texas at Austin
In Austin, Texas
Battle Hall

Tougaloo College
In Madison County, Mississippi
Tougaloo College
Robert O. Wilder Building

Transylvania University
In Lexington, Kentucky
Old Morrison (NHL)

Tulane University
In New Orleans, Louisiana
Tulane University of Louisiana

Tuskegee University

Union College
In Schenectady, NY has 1 NHL:
Nott Memorial Hall (NHL)

United States Military Academy grounds and facilities
In Highlands, New York
United States Military Academy (NHL)

Upper Iowa University
In Fayette, Iowa
College Hall

University of Utah
In Salt Lake City
Carlson Hall
Fort Douglas (NHLD)
University of Utah Circle

Utah State University
In Logan, Utah
Home Economics/Commons Building
Old Main, Utah State University
Women's Residence Hall

Utah Tech University
In St. George, Utah
Main Building of Dixie College

Valparaiso University
In Valparaiso, Indiana
Heritage Hall (Valparaiso University)

Vanderbilt University
In Nashville, Tennessee
Gymnasium, Vanderbilt University
Mechanical Engineering Hall, Vanderbilt University
George Peabody College for Teachers (NHL)
Dyer Observatory in Brentwood, Tennessee

Vassar College
In NY has 2 NHLs:
Main Building (Vassar College) (NHL)
Vassar College Observatory (NHL)

Virginia Intermont College
In Bristol, Virginia
Virginia Intermont College

Virginia Military Institute
In Lexington, Virginia
Barracks, Virginia Military Institute (NHL)
Virginia Military Institute Historic District (NHL)

Virginia Union University
In Richmond, Virginia
Virginia Union University

Virginia State University
In Ettrick, Virginia
Vawter Hall and Old President's House

Virginia Tech 
In Blacksburg, Virginia

 Solitude

Virginia University of Lynchburg
In Lynchburg, Virginia
Virginia University of Lynchburg

University of Virginia
In Charlottesville, Virginia
 Clark Hall, University of Virginia
 Leander McCormick Observatory (on Mount Jefferson)
 The Rotunda (University of Virginia) (NHL)
 University Of Virginia Historic District (NHLD)

Voorhees College
In Denmark, South Carolina
Voorhees College Historic District

Wartburg College
In Waverly, Iowa
Old Main

Washington College
In Chestertown, Maryland
Middle, East and West Halls

Washington University in St. Louis
In St. Louis, Missouri
Washington University Hilltop Campus Historic District (NHL)

Washington and Lee University
In Lexington, Virginia
Lee Chapel (NHL)
Washington and Lee University Historic District (NHLD)

Wayne State University
In Detroit, Michigan
Wayne State University Buildings

Wells College
In Aurora, Cayuga County, New York
Aurora Village-Wells College Historic District

Wesleyan College
In Macon, Georgia
Wesleyan College Historic District

Wesleyan University
In Middletown, CT has 2 NHLs and several other NRHPs:
Alsop House (NHL)
Coite–Hubbard House (aka President's house)
Edward Augustus Russell House (aka Kappa Nu Kappa House)
Samuel Wadsworth Russell House (NHL)
(Wesleyan University may also own some properties in Broad Street Historic District or other historic districts in Middletown).

West Chester University of Pennsylvania
In West Chester, Pennsylvania
West Chester State College Quadrangle Historic District

West Liberty University
In West Liberty, West Virginia

|}

West Virginia State University
In Institute, West Virginia

|}

West Virginia University
In Morgantown, West Virginia

|}

West Virginia University Institute of Technology 
In Montgomery, West Virginia

|}

West Virginia Wesleyan College
In Buckhannon, West Virginia

|}

Western Carolina University
In Cullowhee, North Carolina
Joyner Building

Western Illinois University
In Macomb, Illinois
Western Illinois State Normal School Building

Westchester Community College
In Valhalla, New York
John Hartford House (NHL)

Western Kentucky University
In Bowling Green, Kentucky
Henry Hardin Cherry Hall
Van Meter Hall
Western Kentucky University Heating Plant

Western Michigan University
In Kalamazoo, Michigan
East Hall
Western State Normal School Historic District

Westminster College, Missouri
In Fulton, Missouri
Westminster College Gymnasium (NHL)

Westminster College (Utah)
In Salt Lake City
Converse Hall

Willamette University
In Salem, Oregon
Waller Hall

College of William and Mary
In Williamsburg, Virginia
Wren Building (NHL)

Wilson College
In Chambersburg, Pennsylvania
Wilson College

Winthrop University
In Rock Hill, South Carolina
Tillman Hall
Winthrop College Historic District
Withers Building

University of Wisconsin–La Crosse
In La Crosse, Wisconsin
LaCrosse State Teachers College Training School Building
Main Hall/La Crosse State Normal School
Physical Education Building/La Crosse State Normal School

University of Wisconsin–Madison
In Madison, Wisconsin has 16 (4 NHLs):
Agricultural Chemistry Building
Agricultural Dean's House
Agricultural Engineering Building
Agricultural Heating Station
Agriculture Hall
Bascom Hill Historic District
Hiram Smith Hall and Annex
Horticulture and Agricultural Physics and Soil Science Building
Lathrop Hall
North Hall, University of Wisconsin (NHL)
Old U.S. Forest Products Laboratory
Stock Pavilion
University of Wisconsin Armory and Gymnasium (NHL)
University of Wisconsin Dairy Barn (NHL)
University of Wisconsin Field House
University of Wisconsin Science Hall (NHL)

University of Wisconsin–Oshkosh
In Oshkosh, Wisconsin
Oshkosh State Normal School Historic District
Oviatt House
William E. Pollock Residence

Wofford College
In Spartanburg, South Carolina
Wofford College Historic District

College of Wooster
In Wooster, Ohio
College of Wooster

Yale University
In New Haven, Connecticut has 4 NHLs, and an NRHP historic district:
Connecticut Hall (NHL)
James Dwight Dana House (NHL)
Hillhouse Avenue Historic District
Othniel C. Marsh House (NHL)
Yale Bowl (NHL)

Grove Street Cemetery and Mory's, both listed on the NRHP, are on the campus but are independent of Yale.

Yankton College
In Yankton, South Dakota
Yankton College Conservatory
Yankton College Historic District

Young Harris College
In Young Harris, Georgia
Young Harris College Historic District

National Historic Landmarks by state

Alabama
Foster Auditorium, University of Alabama
Swayne Hall, Talladega College
Tuskegee Airmen National Historic Site, Tuskegee, Alabama
Tuskegee Institute National Historic Site, Tuskegee University

California
Gilman Hall Room 307

Florida
Mary McLeod Bethune Home
Tampa Bay Hotel

Kentucky
Lincoln Hall, Berea College

Indiana
Eleutherian College Classroom and Chapel Building
Hinkle Fieldhouse

Illinois
S.R. Crown Hall
George Herbert Jones Laboratory
Morrow Plots
Old Main, Knox College
Principia College Historic District
University of Illinois Observatory

Iowa
Iowa Old Capitol Building

Massachusetts
Massachusetts Hall, Harvard University
Memorial Hall (Harvard University)
Old Harvard Yard
Sever Hall
University Hall (Harvard University)

Mississippi
Oakland Memorial Chapel

Missouri
Sanborn Field and Soil Erosion Plots
Westminster College Gymnasium

New Jersey
Joseph Henry House, Princeton University
Nassau Hall, Princeton University
President's House (Princeton), Princeton University
Princeton Battlefield, Princeton University
Prospect (Princeton), Princeton University

New York

New York State (excluding NYC)
W. & L. E. Gurley Building
Morrill Hall
Main Building (Vassar College)
Vassar College Observatory
Nott Memorial Hall
Elihu Root House
United States Military Academy

New York City only
Cooper Union
Low Memorial Library
Philosophy Hall
Pupin Hall
Founder's Hall, The Rockefeller University

Ohio
Cincinnati Observatory

Pennsylvania
Old West, Dickinson College
Grey Towers Castle
M. Carey Thomas Library

South Carolina
Chappelle Administration Building, Allen University
Fort Hill, Clemson University
College of Charleston Historic District, College of Charleston

West Virginia
Old Main, Bethany College
Alexander Campbell Mansion

References

Colleges and universities